Telangana Thalli is a symbolic mother goddess for the people of Telangana. It was adopted by the people of  Telangana as a representation of the Goddess of Telangana and Telangana dialect.

History
The original Telangana Thalli statue was designed by B. Venkataramana Chari, a Nirmal resident, and installed at TRS office in Jubilee Hills in 2003. Venkataramana drew inspiration from KCR, the agitation leader's words questioning the existence of Telugu Thalli in Telangana region. The initial design was further improved akin to Bharat Mata, goddess mother. He was accoladed by Chief Minister K. Chandrasekhar Rao on the eve of Independence day in year 2015 at Golconda, Hyderabad for his dedication.

Symbolism
Soon after the statue was released in 2003, Telangana Thalli became a symbolic representation during the agitation of Telangana people for a separate State and was adopted by people as the representation of the Goddess similar to Telugu Thalli. During the Telangana agitation for a separate state, people rejected the idea of Telugu Thalli, which earlier was Andhra Mata not out of disrespect, but to drive home the aspirations of a separate identity for Telugu people from Telangana region.

The Statue
The Goddess statue with a crown, holds maize corn (harvest) in one hand, reflecting prosperity of the region, while Bathukamma, the unique, cultural symbol of Telangana, will be in other hand. 

A new Telangana Thalli statue is designed and sculpted by Department of Sculpture, Potti Sriramulu Telugu University (PSTU), as a tribute to the first World Telugu Conference held in December 2017 at Hyderabad, Telangana.

See also
Siam Devadhiraj
Tamil Thai
Telugu Thalli

References

Culture of Telangana
Mother goddesses
Telugu people